Cryptopenaeus is a genus of prawns within the family Solenoceridae.

Species 

 Cryptopenaeus brevirostris 
 Cryptopenaeus catherinae 
 Cryptopenaeus clevai 
 Cryptopenaeus crosnieri 
 Cryptopenaeus sinensis

References 

Decapod genera
Solenoceridae